Thamarai (English: Lotus) is a 2014–2018 Tamil soap opara that aired on Sun TV in India. The show was broadcast from 3 November 2014 to 4 August 2018, completing 1,129 episodes. The show starred Neelima Rani, Nirosha, Ashwin Kumar, Ferozkhan, and Swetha. The actors Rani, Kumar and Mahalakshmi had previously been cast in the 2009–2013 Sun TV soap opera Chellamay.

The show was directed by M. K. Arunthavaraja, Kuruvidurai K. J. Thangapandiyan, A. Ramachandran, Hafees, and S. Anand Babu, and was produced by Radaan Mediaworks.

Plot summary 
Sneha is a middle-class working girl who lives with her aunt Raji. Raji informs her that Karunakaran, a prisoner believed to have killed Sneha's mother, is also her father and Raji's elder brother. Sneha refuses to accept Karunakaran as her father.

Sneha falls in love with Dwarkesh, whose father Raghavan opposes the relationship. Sneha works in the same company as Rajiv, Dwarkesh's older brother who eloped with his rich girlfriend Uma, and Raghavan wants nothing to do with him. Sneha and Dwarkesh secretly register their marriage. Uma tries to cause conflict by exposing this. However, Raghavan accepts the marriage when he discovers that Dwarkesh and Sneha are cousins, and they have a ceremonial wedding.

Uma tries to become a better person, but her daughter Kushi isn't willing to accept her. To set an example, Sneha accepts Karunakaran as her father – her mother was killed by Muthulakshmi – and Kushi does likewise with Uma. Karunakaran is ill and Sneha prepares to donate a kidney but discovers she is pregnant. When she considers aborting the baby to save her father's life, Dwarkesh sends her out of their home, but later believes this was a mistake. It is revealed that Sneha has died, but look-alike Kavitha threatens Dwarkesh and steals money.

Sushma wins the heart of the Mayil family. Muthulakshmi plots for Kavitha to impersonate Sneha and kill DK, Karunakaran and Raji, but Kavitha/Sneha is instead reunited with the Raghavan family. To prevent Shankar from forcibly marrying Kashthuri, Dwarakesh marries her instead but is shocked when he later sees Kavitha. Kasturi and Kavitha then fight to be the wife of Dwarakesh.

In Poombarai, Sneha is captured by Sudhakar but released after saving his psychotic brother Dhanush. Dhanush, however, attempts to forcibly marry her, and is arrested by Dwarakesh and Sudhakar.

Sushma gives birth to a boy. Sushma and Sneha are jailed for burying Rahul, who was beneath Sushma's bed. They are blamed by Rahul's mother though Muthulakshmi's sister Kanagadurga was behind it. Sushma is later captured by a henchman of Durga, but they are all killed. Sushma returns home and the Mayil family and the Raghavan-Karunakaran family go their separate ways to live in happiness.

Cast

Main cast
 Neelima Rani in a dual role as Sneha Dwarakesh and Kavitha (Kavitha died in the serial, killed by Mayilvaghanan)
 Ashwin Kumar as Dwarakesh Raghavan
 Sailatha as Uma Rajiv
 Sai Prasad /Mohammed Absar as Rajiv Raghavan
 Nirosha as Rajalakshmi
 Aravind as Shyam Ganesh
 Mahalakshmi as Kasthuri 
 Ferozkhan as Inspector Mayilvaghanan
 Swetha as Sushma Mayilvaghanan 
 Shilpa Mary Teresa in a dual role as the main antagonists Muthulakshmi (died) and Kanagadurga (Muthulakshmi's sister)
 "Deivam Thantha Veedu" Nisha as Kumuthavalli (Kumutha)
 Nisha as Aishwarya (Sushma's friend)
 Samantha as Swarnalatha(Main Antagonisti)

Recurring cast
 L. Raja as Karunakaran 
 Srilekha Rajendran as Shantha (Mayil's mother)
 Vasavi as Satya, Mayil's sister
 Babitha as Shyamala Raghavan (Rajiv, Meena and Dwarakesh's mother)
T. V. Varadarajan as Raghavan 
 Dharshini as Kushi Rajiv 
 Jairam in a dual role as Pradeep Choudry and Sanjay
 Sai Mahesh as Dayalan
 Swapna as Meena Saravanan
 Vasanth Gopinath as Saravanan
 Krish as Deena Dhayalan 
 Priyanka as Nethra Sanjay
 Adhitya as Dhanush

Former Cast
 Jyothi Reddy as Kasthuri Karunakaran, sister of Raghavan and mother of Sneha (killed by Muthulakshmi)
 M. J. Shriram as Gajendran (main antagonist, Uma's and Swarnalatha's father; committed suicide)
 Baboos as Pethaperumal
 Puviarasu as Dr.Sakkarai
 Dhanalakshmi as Anjali
 Anushree as Sushma (replaced by Swetha)
 Mahesh/Mithun
 Vijay Lokesh as Sunil/Victor(Sunil, killed by Sushma)
 Sridhar Subramaniyam as R.D. Choudry (IG Sir, died in the serial)
 Sambhavi as Priya Sanjay (died in the serial)
 Rani as IG Sir's wife Rudhra
 T.R. Latha as IG Sir's mother-in-law
 Aravind as Shyam Ganesh
 Nathan Shyam as Kathir
 Sivaji Manohar as Divakar

References

External links 
 Official Website 

2010s Tamil-language television series
2014 Tamil-language television series debuts
2018 Tamil-language television series endings
Sun TV original programming
Tamil-language television shows